is a Japanese rugby union player who plays as a back row forward.

In his home country he plays for the NEC Green Rockets whom he joined in 2011.   He was also named in the first ever  squad which will compete in Super Rugby from the 2016 season.

References

1987 births
Living people
Japanese rugby union players
Rugby union flankers
Green Rockets Tokatsu players
People from Nagano Prefecture
Sunwolves players
Japan international rugby union players